Ruan Roelofse and John-Patrick Smith were the defending champions but Roelofse decided not to participate.
Smith played alongside Matt Reid and won the title, defeating Toshihide Matsui and Danai Udomchoke in the final 6–4, 6–2.

Seeds

Draw

Draw

References 
 Main draw

McDonald's Burnie International - Doubles
2014 Doubles
McDonald's Burnie International - Men's Doubles